Faith Obazuaye (born 4 March 1989) is a Nigerian table tennis player. She competed for Nigeria at local and international table tennis competitions. Obazuaye participated in the female para table tennis competition at the 2018 Commonwealth Games representing Nigeria.

Table tennis 
Obazuaye is a Nigerian class 10 table tennis player, she took part in the Women's Class 10 at the 2018 Commonwealth Games Para Table Tennis Championships in Gold Coast, Australia where she won silver medal. Obazuaye is the only Nigerian female to qualified for the 2020 Summer Paralympics after her results at the 2019 ITTF African Para Championships.

Personal

Faith was born as Faith Oba-zuaye on 4 March 1989 in Benin City the capital of Edo State, Nigeria.

Achievements

Result at the 2018 Gold Coast Commonwealth Games

See also 
 Nigeria at the Paralympics
 Nigeria at the 2020 Summer Olympics

References

 

1989 births
Living people
Paralympic table tennis players of Nigeria
Table tennis players at the 2016 Summer Olympics
Commonwealth Games medallists in table tennis
Commonwealth Games silver medallists for Nigeria
Table tennis players at the 2018 Commonwealth Games
Table tennis players at the 2020 Summer Paralympics
Sportspeople from Benin City
21st-century Nigerian women
Medallists at the 2018 Commonwealth Games